David McGinnis (born August 7, 1951) is a former National Football League (NFL) coach and college player who is the color commentator for the Tennessee Titans Radio Network. He was assistant head coach of the St. Louis/Los Angeles Rams from 2012 to 2016 and head coach of the Arizona Cardinals from 2000 to 2003.

Biography

McGinnis graduated from Snyder High School in Snyder, Texas. He was a three-year starter as a defensive back at Texas Christian University, where he graduated in 1973 with a degree in business management. McGinnis spent 13 years coaching in college football, at Texas Christian University (1973–74, '82), Missouri (1975–77), Indiana State (1978, 1980–81) and Kansas State (1983–85).

From 1986 to 1995, McGinnis was the linebackers coach for the Chicago Bears and defensive coordinator for the Arizona Cardinals from 1996 to 2000.

McGinnis was the assistant head coach/linebackers coach for the Tennessee Titans in 2004.

In 2017, he replaced Frank Wycheck as the color analyst on the Tennessee Titans Radio Network.

Chicago Bears controversy
In 1999, while McGinnis was coaching for the Cardinals, he interviewed for the head coach position with the Chicago Bears. On Thursday, January 22, Bears team president Mike McCaskey prematurely organized a news conference to announce McGinnis as the 12th head coach of the Bears. The news came as a surprise to McGinnis, who had not reached terms on a contract. The Bears postponed the news conference and Bears chairman Ed McCaskey issued an apology to McGinnis. Upset that the news had reached his family, friends, Cardinals team owner Bill Bidwill and head coach Vince Tobin, McGinnis declined the position and removed his name from consideration.

Head coaching record

References

Living people
American football safeties
TCU Horned Frogs football players
Chicago Bears coaches
Arizona Cardinals coaches
Tennessee Titans coaches
Kansas State Wildcats football coaches
1951 births
People from Independence, Kansas
Arizona Cardinals head coaches
St. Louis Rams coaches
National Football League defensive coordinators
National Football League announcers
Tennessee Titans announcers